Waterford IT GAA is the GAA club of the Waterford Institute of Technology, established in 1981. Its hurling team play in the Fitzgibbon Cup and Waterford Crystal Cup as well as Higher Education Leagues. Its football team play in the Sigerson Cup and McGrath Cup as well as Higher Education Leagues. It's camogie team competes in the Ashbourne Cup. The ladies Gaelic football team has competed in the O'Connor Cup.

History
In 1981, Waterford IT GAA consisted of one hurling team playing in Division 3. Today, it has sixteen teams competing in twenty-two competitions in the third level education sector. Teams from Waterford IT have won a total of 71 titles, including: Division 1 Hurling titles, Fitzgibbon Cup trophies, Fresher 1 and Fresher 2 All-Irelands. Ashbourne Cup, Purcell Cups, Division 1 Leagues and numerous men's and Ladies Football titles. Since its foundation, the club has won at least one major title every year. Recent titles include the Fitzgibbon cup in 2003, 2004 and 2006, the Ashbourne cup in 2001, fresher Camogie All-Ireland in 2005, the Division 3 ladies football in 2003, the fresher hurling All-Ireland in 2006 and the fresher hurling and Camogie All-Ireland shield in 2007.

Honours

Notable players
Declan Browne
Éamonn Corcoran
Jake Dillon
Brian Dowling
Tommy Dunne
Harry Kehoe
Pauric Mahony
Eoin Murphy
Gavin O'Brien
Stephen O'Keeffe
Eoin Reid
T. J. Reid
Keith Rossiter
Henry Shefflin

External links
 GAA website

 
Gaelic games clubs in County Waterford
Hurling clubs in County Waterford
Gaelic football clubs in County Waterford
Regional Technical College Gaelic games clubs
GAA